Torkeh-ye Sofla (also Romanized as Torkeh-ye Soflá; also known as Torkeh) is a village in Gurani Rural District, Gahvareh District, Dalahu County, Kermanshah Province, Iran. At the 2006 census, its population was 23, in 4 families.

References 

Populated places in Dalahu County